The 2000 German Formula Three Championship  was a multi-event motor racing championship for single-seat open wheel formula racing cars that held across Europe. The championship featured drivers competing in two-litre Formula Three racing cars built by Dallara and Martini which conform to the technical regulations, or formula, for the championship. It commenced on 22 April at Zolder and ended at Hockenheim on 29 October after ten double-header rounds.

Opel Team KMS driver Giorgio Pantano became a champion. He grabbed the title, winning opening race at Zolder and Oschersleben. Alex Müller finished as runner-up with wins at Zolder, Sachsenring, Lausitz and Hockenheim, losing 14 points to Pantano. Pierre Kaffer was victorious at Norisring, Lausitz, Nürburgring and finished third. André Lotterer became a champion in the Rookie's standings with a fourth place in the main championship. The other race winners was Stefan Mücke, Patrick Friesacher, Enrico Toccacelo and Toshihiro Kaneishi, who completed the top eight in the drivers' championship.

Teams and drivers

Calendar
With the exception of round at Zolder in Belgium, all rounds took place on German soil.

Results

Championship standings

Championship

Junior-Pokal (Rookie) standings

References

External links
 

German Formula Three Championship seasons
Formula Three season
German
German Formula 3